Poznań Old Town is the centermost neighbourhood of the city of Poznań in western Poland, covering the area of the once walled medieval city of Poznań. It is called Stare Miasto in Polish, although that name may also refer to the wider administrative district of Stare Miasto, which extends to most of the city centre and northern parts of the city.

The Old Town is centred on Stary Rynek, the Old Market Square where the historic Poznań Town Hall (Ratusz) stands. It represents the glory of Poznań, from its foundation in 1253. One of Town Hall's towers hosts two small billy goats, which butt their heads together every day at noon. At the western end of the Old Town is the Przemysł Hill (Góra Przemysła) on which the King's castle once stood. The medieval Royal Castle in Poznań has been reconstructed between 2011 and 2016. 

The city walls were taken down when the city expanded in the early 19th century, but the street layout of the Old Town still corresponds closely to that of the former protected city, with a grid of narrow streets. Surviving fragments of the walls, some of which have been further reconstructed, can be seen on Stawna Street, Ludgardy Street, next to Chopin Park in the south of the Old Market Square and best parts are on Masztalarska street in the north. 

Poznań Old Town is listed as one of Poland's official national Historic Monuments (Pomnik historii), as designated November 28, 2008, along with other portions of the city's historic core.  Its listing is maintained by the National Heritage Board of Poland.

Old Market Square 

The original settlement of Poznań was on the river island of Ostrów Tumski, and dates from at least the 9th century. The Old Town neighbourhood, however, corresponds to the city on the left bank of the Warta, to the west of Ostrów Tumski, which received its charter in 1253 (work on the Royal Castle, which would be at the western side of the ring of walls, began several years earlier). 

The Old Market Square (Stary Rynek) is the large square on which the Old Town neighbourhood is centred. There is a group of buildings in the central part of the square, chief of which is the Old Town Hall (Ratusz). On each side of the square are tall rows of former tenement houses (kamienice), many of which are now used as restaurants, cafés and pubs (often with outdoor tables on the square itself). The square was originally laid out in around 1253, with each side divided into 16 equal plots, and many changes to architectural layout and style were made over the centuries. Major changes were made from 1550 onwards by Giovanni Battista di Quadro, who reconstructed the Town Hall and several other buildings in Renaissance style (severe damage had been done to the buildings by a fire of 1536). Most of the buildings in the square were reconstructed following heavy damage in the Battle of Poznań (1945).

The central group of buildings includes:
 The Old Town Hall (see separate article), standing in the northeast corner of the central building group (facing east).
 A row of merchants' houses (domki budnicze), dating from the 16th century, painted in a multicoloured design (1953–1961), with an arcade containing souvenir stalls, facing east. One of the houses (no. 17) displays the coat of arms – a herring and three palms – of the merchants' guild from which the houses take their name.
 The former town chancellery, adjoining the merchants' houses, facing south.
 The old town weighing house (Waga Miejska), behind the Town Hall, facing north. This was first built 1532–1534, reconstructed 1563, demolished as unsafe in 1890 (replaced by a Renaissance-style "New Town Hall" used by the city government, heavily damaged in 1945), rebuilt in its former style in 1950–1960 based on surviving prints, renovated in 2002, now used for weddings and other functions.
 The guardhouse (Odwach), facing west, originally an 18th-century wooden building, rebuilt in Classical style in 1783–1787, heavily damaged in 1945, rebuilt 1949–1951 and used as a museum. It now houses a museum dedicated to the Greater Poland Uprising (1918–1919).
 The Arsenał gallery, a postwar building (1959–1962), standing on the site of a former market building which was used as an arsenal from the 17th century, and was destroyed in 1945.
 The Wielkopolska Military Museum, a modern building (1959–1962) standing on the site of a former cloth hall (sukiennice). The cloth hall existed from 1386 (reconstructed in 1563) until it was converted into houses in the 19th century (destroyed in World War II).

Notable houses among those around the edge of the square include:
 nos. 45, 46 and 47 on the east side of the square, which house a Museum of Musical Instruments.
 no. 48, a reconstructed Gothic building, behind which archaeologists have discovered the remains of a late 13th-century merchant's house, the oldest known brick building in the left-bank city, which probably belonged to the city's founder, Thomas of Guben.
 no. 50, a reconstructed late-Gothic building, on whose wall is a plaque showing the maximum water level during the city's worst ever flood in 1736.
 no. 78 on the west side, known as the Działyński Palace.
 no. 91 on the north side, known as the Mielżyński Palace.

Other features of the square are a punishment post ("pranger", Polish pręgierz) and a fountain depicting Proserpina, on the eastern side in front of the Town Hall; a statue of St. John Nepomucene; and fountains depicting the gods Apollo, Neptune and Mars. Within the central group of buildings is a water fountain depicting a Bamber woman (Bamberka). The Pranger of Poznań is located near the north-east corner of the Poznan City Hall.

Streets in the Old Town

 

The following is a list of present-day names of streets within the area of the former walled city (ul. stands for ulica, meaning "street").

Streets to the north of the market square:
 ul. Stawna ("Pond Street"), approximately following the line of the northern section of the former town walls.
 ul. Masztalarska ("Stableman Street"), running west and then south at the north-east corner of the Old Town. Part of a bastion from the town wall system (mostly reconstructed) stands adjacent to the street. There is also a section of wall, again mostly reconstructed, running between Masztalarska and Stawna (up to the Wronki Gate).
 ul. Mokra ("Wet Street"), connecting Wroniecka and Żydowska.
 ul. Dominikańska ("Dominican Street"), running east from Żydowska.
 ul. Kramarska ("Stallkeepers' Street"), parallel to the north edge of the market square.
 ul. 23 Lutego ("February 23rd Street"), an extension of Kramarska, leading west out of the Old Town neighbourhood (its name commemorates the day of victory in the 1945 Battle of Poznań).
 ul. Szewska ("Tailors' Street"), running north and south from Dominikańska.
 ul. Żydowska ("Jewish Street"), running north from the north-east corner of the square. The north-eastern part of the town was formerly the Jewish Quarter.
 ul. Wroniecka ("Wronki Street"), running north, centrally in relation to the square. It led to the Wronki Gate (Brama Wroniecka), beginning a northward route which crossed the Warta river at Wronki.
 ul. Rynkowa ("Market Street"), a short street between the north-west corner of the square and Kramarska.

Streets to the east of the market square:
 ul. Wielka ("Great Street"), running east from the north-east corner of the square. It led to the "Great Gate" (Brama Wielka), the main eastern exit from the town towards the cathedral.
 ul. Woźna ("Carriage Street"), running east, centrally in relation to the square.
 ul. Wodna ("Water Street"), running east from the south-east corner of the square. It led to the "Water Gate" (Brama Wodna), which gave access to the island of Grobla; the name alludes to the river. On the street close to the market square is the former "palace" of the Górka family, now an archeological museum.
 ul. Klasztorna ("Abbey Street"), parallel to the east side of the square.
 ul. Ślusarska ("Metalworkers' Street"), parallel to and east of Klasztorna.

Streets to the south of the market square:
 ul. Kozia ("Goat Street"), parallel to the south side of the square. It was probably named after a sign showing goats (the name was originally applied to ul. Świętosławska).
 ul. Gołębia ("Pigeon Street"), parallel to and south of Kozia.
 ul. Jaskółcza ("Swallow Street"), connecting Szkolna and Wrocławska, south of Gołębia, on the line of the former walls.
 ul. Szkolna ("School Street"), running south from the south-west corner of the square.
 ul. Wrocławska ("Wrocław Street"), running south, centrally in relation to the square.
 ul. Świętosławska, running south from the south-east corner of the square, to the Fara (traditional parish church). It is named after St. Świętosław, the church's patron.
 Plac Kolegiacki, a square at the east end of Kozia and Gołębia, with the former Jesuit College, which now serves as the city government's offices, on its southern side.
 ul. Za Bramką ("Beyond the Gate"), leading south from Plac Kolegiacki.
(For ul. Klasztorna, which extends as far as Gołębia, see above.)

Streets to the west of the market square:
 ul. Paderewskiego ("Paderewski Street"), running west from the south-east corner of the square. This street was extended westwards at the time of the demolition of the city walls at the start of the 19th century, to connect the Old Town with the new district around today's Plac Wolności. Its present name is linked to the speech given by Ignacy Paderewski at the Bazar hotel (whose building stands at the western end of the street) in December 1918, precipitating the Greater Poland Uprising.
 ul. Franciszkańska ("Franciscan Street"), running west, centrally in relation to the square. A Franciscan monastery stands there.
 Góra Przemysława ("Przemysław's (Przemysł's) Hill"), a street named after the hill on which the Royal Castle stood, running on the slope of that hill, between Zamkowa and Franciszkańska.
 ul. Zamkowa ("Castle Street"), a short street leading west and then north, from the north-west corner of the square.
 ul. Sieroca ("Orphan Street"), parallel to the west side of the square.
 ul. Murna ("Wall Street"), connecting Paderewskiego and Kozia.
 ul. Ludgardy, connecting Paderewskiego and Franciszkańska, on the line of the former walls. A monument to the Greater Poland Uprising (1918) stands there.

See also 
 History of Poznań
 Museum of the History of Poznań

References 

 Henryk Kondziela, Stare Miasto w Poznaniu. Przewodnik, Poznań 1975, Wydawnictwo Poznańskie
 Poznań, przewodnik po zabytkach i historii, Poznań 2003, Wydawnictwo Miejskie, 
 Franciszek Jaśkowiak, Włodzimierz Łęcki, Poznań i okolice. Przewodnik, Warsaw 1983, Sport i Turystyka, 
 Magdalena Warkoczewska (ed.), Kronika Miasta Poznania nr 2003/2, W cieniu wieży ratuszowej, Poznań 2003, Wydawnictwo Miejskie, ISSN 0137-3552

Old Town
Historic districts in Poland